Nicolás Servetto (born 27 March 1996) is an Argentine professional footballer who plays as a forward for Club Almagro.

Career
Following a youth spell with Atlético Macachín, Servetto joined Vélez Sarsfield in 2010. He made the first-team of Argentine Primera División side Vélez Sarsfield in 2016, making his professional bow on 10 April during a win at the Estadio Gigante de Arroyito versus Rosario Central. Four appearances followed across the 2016 and 2016–17 seasons for Vélez Sarsfield. On 11 August 2017, Servetto was loaned to Brown of Primera B Nacional. In his sixth match, he netted the first goal of his senior career versus Atlético de Rafaela. Overall, he featured eleven times for them in all competitions as they reached the play-off semi-finals.

In June 2018, Servetto moved to Primera B de Chile side Deportes Puerto Montt. He left twelve months later, following six goals in twenty-three fixtures; which included a goal on debut versus Cobresal on 28 July.

Career statistics
.

References

External links

1996 births
Living people
People from Macachín
Argentine footballers
Argentine expatriate footballers
Expatriate footballers in Chile
Argentine expatriate sportspeople in Chile
Association football forwards
Argentine Primera División players
Primera Nacional players
Primera B de Chile players
Club Atlético Vélez Sarsfield footballers
Club Atlético Brown footballers
Puerto Montt footballers
Club Almagro players